Babat is a village in Salarpur block, Budaun district, Uttar Pradesh, India. The Budaun railway station is located at the distance of 10 kilometer from the village. Babat village is administrated by Gram panchayat. Its village code is 128242. According to 2011 Census of India, the total population of the village is 2586, out of 1,387 are males and 1,199 are females.

References

Villages in Budaun district